Combaillaux is a commune in the Hérault department in southern France.

Population

See also
Communes of the Hérault department

References

External links

Official site

Communes of Hérault